XHAR-FM (branded as La Mexicana) is a Mexican Spanish-language FM radio station in Tampico, with transmitter at Pueblo Viejo, Veracruz.

History
XEAR-AM 1490 received its concession on July 11, 1980. Owned by Enrique Cárdenas González, a future Governor of Tamaulipas who owned various radio stations in the state, it broadcast with 1,000 watts. In 1990, XEAR was sold to Comercializadora de Eventos Radiofónicos, marking the beginning of Radiorama/Grupo AS operation of the station, and in the decade that followed it moved to 660 kHz and raised power to 5,000 watts during the day.

XEAR was cleared to migrate to FM in 2012.

References

Regional Mexican radio stations
Radio stations in Tampico
Radio stations in Veracruz